Abdul Mashhood Khan is an Indian politician and member of the Samajwadi Party. He was a candidate in the 2012 Uttar Pradesh Legislative Assembly election and the 2017 Uttar Pradesh Legislative Assembly election to represent Tulsipur.

References 

Samajwadi Party politicians
Year of birth missing (living people)
Living people
Samajwadi Party politicians from Uttar Pradesh